Parkin is a gingerbread cake traditionally made with oatmeal and black treacle, which originated in northern England. Often associated with Yorkshire, it is widespread and popular elsewhere, notably in Lancashire. Parkin is baked to a hard cake but with resting becomes moist and even sometimes sticky. There are regional differences, for example in Hull and East Yorkshire, it has a drier, more biscuit-like texture than in other areas whereas in Lancashire it is generally made with golden syrup rather than the treacle used elsewhere. Parkin is traditionally eaten on Guy Fawkes Night, 5 November, but is also enjoyed throughout the winter months. It is baked commercially throughout Yorkshire, but is mainly a domestic product in other areas.

Etymology
The origin of the word parkin is unknown. The first published dated reference to parkin was collected from 1728 from the West Riding of Yorkshire Quarter Sessions when Anne Whittaker was accused of stealing oatmeal to make parkin. The Lancashire schoolmaster and poet Tim Bobbin describes tharf cake in 1740, and this is recognisable as a parkin. A possible older use of parkin is in the seventeenth century ballad 'The song of Arthur O'Bradley that purports to describe a merry wedding from the time of Robin Hood (fourteenth century)

John Wycliffe in his translation of the Bible in 1389 (Mark Ch.14.v. 1) calls unleavened bread a " " 

History
Parkin is virtually unknown in the south of England . It is eaten in an area where oats were the staple grain for the poor, rather than wheat. It is closely related to tharf cake''' – an unsweetened cake cooked on a griddle rather than baked. The traditional time of the year for tharf cakes to be made was directly after the oat harvest in the first week in November. For festive occasions, the cake would be sweetened with honey. In the seventeenth century (about 1650) sugar started to be imported from Barbados, and molasses was a by-product of the refining process. Molasses was first used by apothecaries; to make a medicine theriaca, from which name the word treacle is derived. As molasses became plentiful, or treacle as it became called at that time, it was substituted for honey in the preparation of tharf cakes.

In Northern Europe honey was used as a medicine, for festive cakes and making mead; before 1750 sweetness was not a characteristic of everyday food. Honey cakes had a special festive significance. They were baked to be hard, but after storage for a couple of weeks they regained their moisture becoming soft and even sticky. Molasses has hygroscopic properties. German Lebkuchen and Pfefferkuchen were other examples of hygroscopic holiday ginger-breads. They too were baked hard in summer and allowed to moisten for consumption at Christmas.

Though parkin and tharf cake appear to be synonymous, all parkins generally were sweet tharf cakes.

Tharf cake
Parkin and tharf cake were used interchangeably in Lancashire and South Yorkshire until 1900. Over the 500 years the recipe and taste of these cakes have changed considerably.  It was the food of the poor. Ovens were rare in the houses of the poor, and they generally had no access to public bakers before the 1820s, so the cakes were cooked on griddles or bakestones on an open fire. The best parkin was made with fresh oatmeal, which fixes the date around the first week in November.

Festivities
In southern Lancashire and West Yorkshire, parkin is linked to the Guy Fawkes Night celebration. Jennifer Stead, in her study Prodigal Frugality, identifies the link between Guy Fawkes and parkin as the bonfire. The first two weeks in November had many Christian festivals, and like Celtic festivals that preceded them they were celebrated with a fire and ritual cakes. November starts with All Hallows Eve, that runs into All Saints Day (1 November), which is followed by All Souls Day (2 November).  Little Lent and the forty-day fast until Christmas, started at Martinmas. (11 November). On All Souls Day soul cakes were baked. The Martinmas fair was important being the traditional day when cattle were bought and sold, and servants were hired for the following year. It was also the date that cattle were slaughtered and salted to preserve them for the winter and for general feasting and dancing.

The Celtic festival of Samain, the festival of the dead on 1 November, was celebrated with special cakes and bonfires. It was Christianised into All Hallows by the church in 837 AD, and the culinary tradition continued. When Guy Fawkes in 1605 gave the English church a reason to celebrate with a bonfire, the tradition was adopted under the new name, just four days later on 5 November. During the period of industrialisation many traditional holidays were discontinued but Guy Fawkes Night continued to be celebrated. In the nineteenth century (1862), parkin and treacle toffee with potatoes baked in the fire had become the traditional foods of Guy Fawkes Night, and in Leeds, November 5 became known as Parkin Night.

Ingredients
The principal ingredients of a Yorkshire parkin are oatmeal, flour, black treacle (similar to molasses), fat (traditionally lard, but modern recipes use butter, margarine or rapeseed oil), and ginger. Oatmeal and golden syrup are generally considered distinctive features of Lancashire parkin, whilst Yorkshire Parkin is baked using treacle and soft brown sugar.

The flour used in parkin in England is self-raising, containing a small amount of chemical leavening agent. If this is not available, or if the proportion of oatmeal is high, it is essential to add a leavening agent, e.g. baking powder or a mixture of sodium bicarbonate and cream of tartar.

One of the key features of parkin is that it retains its texture well. It is baked to be hard, but after storing in a sealed tin or box for several days, it becomes soft again, the texture that is intended.

See also
 Flapjack (oat bar)
 Lancashire Parkin recipe
 List of English dishes

References

Notes

Footnotes

Bibliography
 Concise Oxford English Dictionary, s.v.'' parkin
 
 BBC good food, Discussion of Parkin Day

British cakes
Yorkshire cuisine
Lancashire cuisine
English cuisine
Northern England
Oat-based dishes
Honey cakes